Boykin or Boykins may refer to:

People
A. Wade Boykin, American psychology professor
Amber Boykins (b.1969), American politician from St. Louis, Missouri
Brandon Boykin, American football player
Christopher "Big Black" Boykin, American television personality
Deral Boykin, American football player
Dwight Boykins (b. 1963), American politician from Houston, Texas
Earl Boykins, American professional basketball player
Frank W. Boykin (1885-1969), US congressman from Mobile, Alabama
Jarrett Boykin, American football player
Keith Boykin (b. 1965), American broadcaster and commentator
Laura Boykin, American computational biologist
McKinley Boykin, American football player
Miles Boykin, American football player
Otis Boykin (1920-1982), African-American inventor and engineer
Ronnie Boykins, jazz bassist
Trevone Boykin, American football player
William G. Boykin (b. 1948), former U.S. Army general and Deputy Undersecretary of Defense for Intelligence

Places
In the United States
Boykin, Alabama
Boykin, Georgia
Boykin, South Carolina (disambiguation)
Boykins, Virginia

Other
Boykin Spaniel, a dog breed